Saltfleetby-Theddlethorpe Dunes is a national nature reserve on the coast of Lincolnshire, England, in the parishes of Saltfleetby and Theddlethorpe. It is on Rimac Road and sometimes referred to as Rimac.

The reserve is one of only around 60 places in the UK where the natterjack toad is found. In summer, many species of orchids can be seen on the dunes and dune slacks. Other wildlife includes cuckoo, barn owl and six-spot burnet moth.

A large part of the reserve, close to the car park, is wheelchair-friendly.

References

External links

Saltfleetby-Theddlethorpe Dunes Lincolnshire Wildlife Trust

Nature Conservation Review sites
Nature reserves in Lincolnshire
National nature reserves in England
Lincolnshire coast
Dunes of England